The Awakening is a 2006 Bollywood documentary short film produced by Ajay Devgn and Kumar Mangat Pathak and directed by Faruk Kabir.

Plot
The film has an interaction between Ajay Devgn and a small kid who lost his parents in the Mumbai floods on 26 July 2005. Ajay Devgan then shares his own bad experience on that day.

Cast
Ajay Devgn 
Anjaan Ali

References

External links
 

2006 films
2000s Hindi-language films
Ajay Devgn